The Lehigh Valley Cougars were a W-League  women's soccer club based in Allentown, Pennsylvania. The team folded after the 1996 season.

Year-by-year

Defunct USL W-League (1995–2015) teams
Soccer clubs in Pennsylvania
1996 disestablishments in Pennsylvania
Association football clubs established in 1996
Association football clubs disestablished in 1996
1996 establishments in Pennsylvania
Women's sports in Pennsylvania